Built to Last is a studio album by American band Sick of It All, released in 1997. Equal Vision Records held the exclusive rights to release it on vinyl.

The album peaked at No. 32 on the Billboard Heatseekers Albums chart.

Production
Built to Last was the result of a year's work for Sick of It All, with pre-production beginning in late 1995/early 1996. The recording took place at Normandy Sound, in Warren, Rhode Island (where their first three albums had been recorded), and in two studios in California.

Critical reception
The Washington Post wrote that "the music and attitude are entirely predictable, but the 'hey-hey-heys' are rather charming." Entertainment Weekly wrote that the band manages "to overcome the genre’s bark-and-lunge cliches simply because they’re so archetypal; these guys can actually make you feel the fury behind a song called 'Us Vs. Them'."

Track listing
All tracks written by Sick of It All
"Good Lookin' Out" – 1:53
"Built to Last" – 2:01
"Closer" – 2:56
"One Step Ahead" – 2:07
"Us vs. Them" – 3:04
"Laughingstock" – 2:42
"Don't Follow" – 2:02
"Nice" – 2:41
"Busted" – 1:37
"Burn 'em Down" – 2:55
"End the Era" – 3:05
"Chip Away" – 2:02
"Too Late" – 2:00
"Jungle" – 8:10

"Jungle" ends at 2:54, with silence from 2:55 to 5:53; at 5:54, a voice says "Oh c'mon, hurry up, ya old hag." There is silence again from 5:58 to 6:59. A hidden song, sung in English and Spanish, starts at 7:00 (unofficially titled "Culo Cagado").

Credits
Lou Koller – vocals
Pete Koller – guitar
Craig Setari – bass guitar
Armand Majidi – drums
George Correia – percussion
Produced by GGGarth and Sick of It All
Engineered by GGGarth and Greg Fidelman

References

1997 albums
Albums produced by Garth Richardson
Sick of It All albums
East West Records albums
Equal Vision Records albums
Albums recorded at Sound City Studios